Miguel Donoso Pareja (July 13, 1931 – March 16, 2015) was an Ecuadorian writer and 2006 Premio Eugenio Espejo Award-winner (Ecuador's National Prize in literature, given by the President of Ecuador).

Biography
Donoso Pareja's father was Miguel Donoso Moncayo (1896–1971) from Quito and his mother was Leonor Pareja Diezcanseco from Guayaquil. His uncle was the novelist and diplomat Alfredo Pareja Diezcanseco (1908–1993).

Beginning in 1951, Donoso Pareja frequented the Guayaquil home of Enrique Gil Gilbert where he engaged with other young poets and writers of the time. In 1962 he joined the Communist Party. In 1963 Donoso Pareja became the head of fundraising of the weekly newspaper El Pueblo ("The People"), which was the Communist Party's main publication in Guayaquil. In just a few weeks the police raided and ransacked his home, accusing him of being a terrorist. They took pictures of him with small pieces of metal that looked to contain gunpowder, and the newspapers printed these photographs and accused him of possessing grenades. He was released after two days, but great damage had been done to his reputation.

A few weeks later, on July 11, 1963, the military junta of Ramon Castro Jijón took control of Ecuador, and Donoso Pareja went into hiding, and the newspapers reported that he "went underground". One afternoon, at a secret meeting in darkness set up with his daughters at the Odeon Cinema, but was followed and arrested by junta agents, amidst a tumultuous display. Donoso Pareja was detained in prison barracks for ten months without trial. He was then expelled to Mexico, given a tourist passport, and released without any money. He had to request assistance from friends in order to afford to travel out of the country.

In Mexico, Donoso Pareja worked as a literature and writing teacher in various institutions, including the National Autonomous University of Mexico and the National Institute of Fine Arts. He also worked as a newspaper writer. In 1976, he edited the magazine Cambio ("Change") along with other famous writers such as Juan Rulfo, Julio Cortázar, José Revueltas, Pedro Orgambide, and Eraclio Zepeda, until the magazine's final publication in 1981.

In 1976, Donoso Pareja wrote Día tras día ("Day After Day"), which is a novel about his exile. In 1981, nearly 18 years after being expelled from Ecuador, he decided to return to his homeland, leaving behind his job and friends in Mexico. That year, he wrote Nunca más el mar ("Never Again the Sea"), a novel about his own return from exile.

In 1985 Donoso Pareja was awarded a Guggenheim Fellowship grant of $26,000 to write fiction; he then traveled several months in Spain and other European countries and spent all the money, and so returned to Ecuador, locked himself up in a borrowed apartment, and wrote 22 stories of love, which expressed a deep sense of loneliness and despair. The stories were published in a book titled Lo mismo que el olvido ("Same as Oblivion").

In 198?, Donoso Pareja was elected president of the Guayas branch of the House of Ecuadorian Culture, and moved permanently to Guayaquil. He died on March 13, 2015, aged 83, after years of suffering from Parkinson's disease.

Family
Donoso Pareja married Judith Gutiérrez Moscoso from Babahoyo, divorcing in 1967. By Gutiérrez Moscoso, had Leonor, died as an adolescent, Maria del Carmen
and Miguel Donoso Gutiérrez, who authored a collection of short stories titled "Punta de Santa Clara", which received the Jose de la Cuadra Prize (1982)

In 1979, Donoso Pareja married Corunnan born and Cuban raised Aralia López González, divorcing in 1983.

Works
 La Mutación del Hombre (1958), poetry
 Las Raíces del Hombre (1958), poetry
 Krelko y otros cuentos (1962), stories
 Los Invencibles (1963), poetry
 Primera Canción del Exilado (1968), poetry
 El Hombre que mataba a sus hijos (1968), stories
 Henry Blak (1983), novel
 La Hora del Lobo (1970), a collection of articles about literature and cinema
 Día tras día (1976), a novel about his exile
 Cantos para celebrar una Muerte (1977), poetry
 Nunca más el mar (1981), a novel about his return from exile
 Lo mismo que el olvido (1985) stories
 Todo lo que inventamos es cierto (1991), stories
 Hoy empiezo a acordarme (1994), novel
 El Otro lado del Espejo (1996), stories
 La Muerte de Tyrone Power López en el monumental Barcelona (1997), novel
 Ecuador, identidad o esquizofrenia (1998) a sociology booklet about Ecuadorian national identity

References 

1931 births
2015 deaths
Ecuadorian male writers
People from Guayaquil